Toni Braxton & Babyface Live was a 4-day co-headlining concert tour in Africa by American recording artists Toni Braxton and Babyface, in support of their duet album, Love, Marriage & Divorce. The outing started on August 28, in Zimbabwe and ended on September 3, in Johannesburg. This marked the first time both singers embarked on a tour together. Highlights of the tour, included performing together their Grammy winning duet single "Hurt You".

Set list
Babyface
"For the Cool in You"
"Every Time I Close My Eyes"
"Never Keeping Secrets"
"Soon as I Get Home"
"Slow Jam"
"Rocky Steady"
"Two Occasions"
"Whip Appeal"
Toni Braxton
"He Wasn't Man Enough"
"You're Makin' Me High"
"I Heart You"
"Seven Whole Days"
"You Mean the World to Me" 
"Another Sad Love Song"
"Love Shoulda Brought You Home" 
"Just Be a Man About It"
"Breathe Again"
"Hurt You" (performed with Babyface)
"Un-Break My Heart"

Shows

External links
Toni Braxton International Fanpage|Facebook

References

2015 concert tours
Co-headlining concert tours
Toni Braxton concert tours